The 2019–20 Indian Women's League final round will be played between twelve teams divided into two groups to decide the champion of Indian Women's League fourth season. It will be played from 24 January to 14 February at the Bangalore Football Stadium in Bengaluru.

Teams

Group stage

Group A

Table

Matches

Group B

Table

Matches

Knock–out stage
Top two teams from each group will make it to the semifinals, will be played on February 10 and the final will be held on February 14.

Bracket

Semi-finals

Final

Statistics

Top scorers

Hat-tricks 
Result column shows goal tally of player's team first.

Season awards
Hero Indian Women's League 2019–20 awards.

References

External links
 Fixtures and results

Indian Women's League
2019–20 in Indian football leagues
Indian Women's League final round